was a town located in Yūfutsu (Iburi) District, Iburi Subprefecture, Hokkaido, Japan.

As of 2005, the town had an estimated population of 3,981 and a density of 48.24 persons per km2. The total area was 82.52 km2.

On March 27, 2006, Oiwake was merged with the town of Hayakita (also from Yufutsu (Iburi) District) to create the new town of Abira.

External links
 Abira official website 

Dissolved municipalities of Hokkaido